Reform the Legal System, later known as the Human Rights Party, was a political party in New South Wales. It was largely associated with MLC Peter Breen, its leader, who was elected in the 1999 state election. The party was renamed the "Human Rights Party" after Breen's brief membership of the Labor Party in 2006. Breen was defeated at the 2007 state election.

The party was registered for federal elections as "Peter Breen – Reform The Legal System" from 30 November 2000 to 15 November 2002.

References

Defunct political parties in New South Wales